is a city located in Kyoto Prefecture, Japan.  the city has an estimated population of 80,608 and a population density of 4,205 persons per km². The total area is 19.17 km².

History
The city was founded on October 1, 1972 replacing the town of Nagaoka, which was in turn incorporated by three villages on October 1, 1949. The name of city is derived from Nagaoka-kyō, the ancient Japanese capital Emperor Kanmu established there from 784 until 794. The major part of the capital including the imperial palace was in the area of present-day Mukō.

Demographics
Per Japanese census data, the population of Nagaokakyō has increased slightly in recent decades.

Culture
The most popular event in Nagaokakyo is the Garasha Festival.  It is usually held in November. Hosokawa Gracia was the wife of a busho—a feudal lord's lieutenant. The Garasha Festival is held at both the Nagaokakyo Cultural Center and Shoryuji Castle, while the parade runs throughout the city.  Many of the parade participants wear various period's traditional clothing, including the chosen 'Garasha' of the year.

Transportation
 Kyoto-Jukan Expressway
 Nagaokakyō Station
 Nagaoka-Tenjin Station
 Nishiyama Tennozan Station

Organizations
Murata Manufacturing and Mitsubishi Logisnext are based in Nagaokakyō.

Sister cities
 Arlington, MA, United States

Notable people from Nagaokakyō
 Kenjiro Yamashita, member of J-pop boygroups Exile and Sandaime J Soul Brothers and a former member of Gekidan Exile.
 Shohei Yamamoto, Japanese former soccer player
 Hiroshi Otsuki, Japanese former football player and manager
 Aya Shimokozuru, Japanese former soccer player (Japan women's national football team)
 Takashi Usami, Japanese soccer player (Gamba Osaka, J1 League)
 Miho Takahashi, Japanese swimmer
 Masaaki Sakata, Japanese former rugby union player
 Ayumi Kaihori, Japanese former soccer player (Japan women's national football team)

See also
 Capital of Japan
 2005 Nagaokakyō city assembly election

References

External links

 Nagaokakyō City official website
 Past Exhibitions – National Museum of Japanese History

1972 establishments in Japan
Cities in Kyoto Prefecture